Willem Steenkamp  is a South African author, journalist, historian, military analyst and citizen soldier. He has published a number of books and consults widely in military affairs.

Awards
 Cited in 1967 and 1968 in United Press International's annual selection of its best news feature articles worldwide.
 Awarded the Settlers' Prize for Enterprising Journalism in 1982.
 Awarded the Maskew Miller Prize (co-winner with James Ambrose Brown) in 1983 for the Anglo-Boer War novel "The Blockhouse".
 Awarded the Lady Usher Memorial Prize in 1985 for the historical novel "The Horse Thief".
 Awarded the Barcom Prize for Professional Military Writing in 1988 for an essay on future amphibious assault personnel requirements.

Appointments 
Justice of the peace (appointed 1993).
UN international election observer (appointed 1994).
 Member of the Ceremonial Staff Board (advisory body to the SANDF's Director of Ceremonial and Military Music) up to 2004.
 Member of the VOC Foundation.

Military service

List of postings and tasks
 1958: Called up for Active Citizen Force service: Study deferment.
 19611965: Routine non-continuous regimental service.
 19661969: On inactive reserve.
 19691979: Regimental service (training and operational).
 19801983: Seconded to 71 Motorised Brigade staff.
 19841990: Regimental service (training and operational).
 19901992: Seconded to 75 Motorised Brigade/9 SA Division staff.
 1993to date: Regimental service, in various capacities: inter alia officer in charge of designing and implementing the wreath-laying at Woltemade Cemetery by HM Queen Elizabeth II, 1995.
 Extra-regimental/staff employment:
 Secondments to 71 Motorised Brigade and 75 Motorised Brigade/9 SA Division, as noted.
 Observer on three external operations, 19791985.
 Minute-taker/diarist: Operation Sclera (1984 South AfricanAngolan Joint Monitoring Commission).
 Member/scriba of official SADF delegation sent to attend national convention of United States Reserve Officers' Association at Nashville, Tennessee, July 1993; also visited ROA head office in Washington DC for confidential briefing to convey to SA Minister of Defence
 19971998: Member of the SA National Defence Force's Education, Training and Development Team (with Lt Col A. M. Marriner ) revising Reserve Force training

Military Awards 
 
 Chief of the Army's Commendation

Published Books 
 Ngami! (1971). Fictionalised re-telling in Afrikaans, for mid-teenagers, of explorer Charles John Andersson's epic mid-19th-Century trek from Walvis Bay to Lake Ngami.
 Land of the Thirst King (1975reprinted 1979). Historical/contemporary travel book about Namaqualand (North-West Cape Province).
 Adeus Angola (1976). First account of the initial South African military incursion into Angola.
 The Soldiers (1978). Short interlinked biographies of Generals Christiaan de Wet, Koos de la Rey, Sir Henry Timson Lukin, Sir Jaap van Deventer, Dan Pienaar and Evered Poole
 Poor Man's Bioscope (1979). Historical/contemporary travel book about Cape Town
  Moedverloor (1980). Historical novel, in Afrikaans, about Great Namaqualand (now Namibia) in the 19th Century
 Sê vir Leonardo (1980). Contemporary action novel, in Afrikaans, set in Cape Town
 Aircraft of the South African Air Force (1981). Illustrated survey of contemporary SAAF aircraft; later reprinted as Jane's Book of the SAAF 
 Borderstrike! (1983). First detailed account of early South African military incursions into Angola, 1978–1980.  Expanded/re-edited edition 2003
 Namakwalandse Oustories (1983). Re-telling, in Afrikaans, of traditional Namaqualand folk-tales
 Christmas Story/Kersverhaal (1984). Re-telling of the Nativity, in separate English and Afrikaans versions, from the viewpoint of the animals in the stable
 The Horse Thief (1985). Historical novel set in Namaqualand in the 1870s (winner of 1985 Lady Usher Memorial Prize, and later staged at Nico Malan Theatre, Cape Town)
 Blake's Woman (1986). Historical novel set in 19th-Century Great Namaqualand (now Namibia)
 The Blockhouse (1987). Historical novel set at the end of the Second Anglo-Boer War (co-winner of Maskew Miller Prize)
 South Africa's Border War, 1966–1989 (1989). Illustrated history of the SWA/Namibian border war
 Jim Zulu (2006). Historical novel set in the Kimberley diamond diggings area of the 1880s, inspired by South Africa's only known case of public lynching
 Assegais, Drums and Dragoons (2012). The early military and social history of the Cape of Good Hope, 1510–1806  
 The Black Beret: the history of the SA Armoured Corps, Volume 1 (early beginnings up to 842 Madagascar campaign) 2016)
 SA's Border War 1966–1989 (revised and updated edition) (2016)
 SA se Grensoorlog 1966–1989 (revised and updated edition) (2016)
 Mobility Conquers: The Story of 61 Mechanised Battalion Group 1978–2005, with Helmoed-Römer Heitman (September 2016)

Notes

References

External links
Just Done Productions Publishing website

.

20th-century South African historians
South African people of Dutch descent
South African military personnel of the Border War
South African Army officers
1940 births
Living people
Historians of South Africa
South African male novelists
Military historians
20th-century South African novelists
20th-century South African male writers
Male non-fiction writers
21st-century South African historians